The Lindbergh operation was a complete tele-surgical operation carried out by a team of French surgeons located in New York on a patient in Strasbourg, France (over a distance of several thousand miles) using telecommunications solutions based on high-speed services and sophisticated Zeus surgical robot. The operation was performed successfully on September 7, 2001 by Professor Jacques Marescaux and his team from the IRCAD (Institute for Research into Cancer of the Digestive System). This was the first time in medical history that a technical solution proved capable of reducing the time delay inherent to long distance transmissions sufficiently to make this type of procedure possible. The name was derived from the American aviator Charles Lindbergh, because he was the first person to fly solo across the Atlantic Ocean.

Details of the procedure
The operation involved minimally invasive surgery: The 45-minute procedure consisted of a cholecystectomy on a 68-year-old female patient in surgical ward A in Strasbourg Civil Hospital, in Eastern France. From New York, the surgeon controlled the arms of the ZEUS Robotic Surgical System, designed by Computer Motion, to operate on the patient. The link between the robotic system and the surgeon was provided by a high-speed fiberoptic service deployed thanks to the combined efforts of several France Telecom group entities.

Commenting on the operation, Professor Marescaux said:

Project partners
The surgery was the result of a closely coordinated partnership between IRCAD, the France Télécom group and Computer Motion, the developer of Zeus surgical robotic systems. The EITS (European Institute of Telesurgery) was also involved.

Computer Motion - Zeus Telesurgery System
The Zeus robotic system was developed in mid 1990s to enable a surgeon in the OR to perform the operation seated at surgeon console a few meters away vs. traditional surgery where surgeon was at the OR table and next to the patient.  The telesurgery project named Lindbergh operation required the Zeus robotic system to be modified so the surgeon is thousands of miles away from the OR table.  There were many challenges to overcome: Zeus system was an FDA cleared surgical system and none of its software could be adjusted due to the clearance, and also in part because of lack of assigned engineering resources to the project as main focus of the company was on next generation Zeus projects including redesign of the surgeon console from "instrument handle control" to "instrument tip control".  This project was internally assigned in late 1999 to one of Computer Motion's seasoned engineers, Moji Ghodoussi, Ph.D. to manage, with engineering lead assigned to Sudipto Sur, Ph.D.  Significant challenges: technical, operational, business, personnel, regulatory, and more were met along the way, which at a later date will be published either here or under a separate page that will shed light for future teams innovating in fields of technology in general and surgery in particular.

See also 
 Laparoscopic surgery
 Remote surgery
 Robotic surgery

References
 Marescaux J, Leroy J, Rubino F, Vix M, Simone M, Mutter D. Transcontinental Robot Assisted Remote Telesurgery: Feasibility and Potential Applications. Annals of Surgery 2002;235:487-92.
 Marescaux J. Nom de code: " Opération Lindbergh " – Ann Chir 2002;127:2–4.
 Marescaux J, et al. Transatlantic Robot-Assisted Telesurgery. Nature 2001;413:379–380.
 Marescaux J, Dutson E, Rubino F. The Impact of Robotics on General Surgery Training. Annals of Surgery 2002;235:446.
 

Surgical procedures and techniques
Surgical robots
Videotelephony